Pi (stylized as ) is a 1998 American conceptual psychological thriller film written and directed by Darren Aronofsky (in his feature directorial debut). Pi was filmed on high-contrast black-and-white reversal film and title refers to the mathematical constant pi, the story about a mathematician with an obsession to find underlying complete order in the real world, and contrasts two seemingly irreconcilable entities: the imperfect irrationality of humanity; and the rigor and regularity of mathematics, specifically number theory. The film explores themes of religion, mysticism, and the relationship of the universe to mathematics.

The film received positive reviews and earned Aronofsky the Directing Award at the 1998 Sundance Film Festival, the Independent Spirit Award for Best First Screenplay and the Gotham Open Palm Award.

Plot
Unemployed number theorist Max Cohen, who lives in a drab apartment in Chinatown, Manhattan, believes everything in nature can be understood through numbers.  He suffers from cluster headaches, extreme paranoia, hallucinations, and schizoid personality disorder. His only social interactions are with his mathematics mentor, Sol Robeson (now disabled from a stroke), and those who live in his building: Jenna, a little girl fascinated by his ability to perform complex calculations; and Devi, a young woman living next door who sometimes speaks with him.  

Max tries to program his computer, Euclid, to make stock predictions. Euclid malfunctions, printing out a seemingly random 216-digit number, as well as a single pick at one-tenth its current value, then crashes. Disgusted, Max throws away the printout. The next morning, he learns that Euclid's pick was accurate, but cannot find the printout. When Max mentions the number, Sol becomes unnerved and asks if it contained 216 digits, revealing that he came across the same number years ago. He urges Max to take a break from his work.

Max meets Lenny Meyer, a Hasidic Jew who does mathematical research on the Torah. Lenny demonstrates some simple Gematria, the correspondence of the Hebrew alphabet to numbers, and explains that some people believe the Torah is a string of numbers forming a code sent by God. Intrigued, Max notes some of the concepts parallel other mathematical concepts such as the Fibonacci sequence. Agents of a Wall Street firm approach Max; one of them, Marcy Dawson, offers him a classified computer chip called "Ming Mecca" in exchange for the results of his work.

Using the chip, Max has Euclid analyze mathematical patterns in the Torah. Once again, Euclid displays the 216-digit number before crashing. As Max writes down the number, he realizes that he knows the pattern, undergoes an epiphany, and passes out. Waking up, Max appears to become clairvoyant and visualizes the stock market patterns he had searched for. His headaches intensify, and he discovers a vein-like bulge protruding from his right temple. Max has a falling out with Sol after Sol urges him to quit his work.

Dawson and her agents grab Max on the street and try to force him to explain the number, having found the printout Max threw away. Attempting to use it to manipulate the stock market, the firm instead caused the market to crash. Driving by, Lenny rescues Max, but takes him to his companions at a nearby synagogue. They ask Max to give them the 216-digit number, believing it was meant for them to bring about the messianic age, as the number represents the unspeakable name of God. Max refuses, insisting that the number has been revealed to him alone.

Max flees and visits Sol, only to learn from his daughter Jenny that he died from another stroke, and finds a piece of paper with the number in his study. At his own apartment, Max experiences another headache but does not take his painkillers. Driven insane, he destroys part of Euclid. Believing the number and the headaches are linked, Max tries to concentrate on the number through his pain. After passing out, Max has a vision of himself standing in a white void and repeating the digits of the number. The vision ends with Max hugging Devi, who turns out to be a hallucination. Standing alone in his trashed apartment, Max burns the paper with the number and begins to use a drill on his head in a trepanning procedure.

Sometime later, Jenna approaches Max in a park and asks him to do several calculations, including 748 ÷ 238 (an approximation for pi). Max smiles and says that he does not know the answer. He sits on the bench and watches the trees blowing in the breeze, seemingly at peace.

Cast
 Sean Gullette as Maximillian "Max" Cohen
 Mark Margolis as Sol Robeson
 Ben Shenkman as Lenny Meyer
 Samia Shoaib as Devi
 Pamela Hart as Marcy Dawson
 Stephen Pearlman as Rabbi Cohen
 Ajay Naidu as Farouq
 Kristyn Mae-Anne Lao as Jenna
 Lauren Fox as Jenny Robeson
 Clint Mansell as Photographer

Production
Before production, to finance the complex visual sets and shots for the film, producer Eric Watson and director Darren Aronofsky begged every friend, relative, or acquaintance for donations of $100 each. Eventually, they accumulated an estimated $60,000 for their production budget.

The film was shot on an Aaton XTR Prod Camera, which shoots with 16mm film, with a Bolex H16 Camera used for most of the handheld shots. Lenses were from Angenieux. The film was shot on black and white reversal film stock; Aronofsky aimed for high-contrast shots to give Pi a more "technically raw and spontaneous" look.

Within Pi, stunts were replaced with ideas, action sequences with allegorical montages, and special effects with a haunting redefinition of New York City. For the main set which was Max Cohen's apartment, Scott Franklin's father allowed the production to use a warehouse he owned in Bushwick, Brooklyn. A back room was cleared out and used as a sound stage, upon which Max's Euclid supercomputer was built. The majority of the film was shot. New York was chosen as the setting due to Darren Aronofsky's upbringing and all that he was surrounded with growing up. The nuanced multicultural view of the city in the film reflects Aronofsky's personal views of New York. Shooting on location would require expensive permits to be obtained; to get around this, much of the film was technically shot illegally, with all of the subway and outdoor city scenes shot without permits.

Finishing the film was more costly than shooting it. The post-budget was $68,183, most of which went into post-production sound, film and lab work, and film editing. Throughout the filming, fifty-three thousand feet of 16mm film was shot, amounting to about 23 hours over 28 days.

Budget breakdown
Pi was produced under the SAG Limited Exhibition Agreement, which allowed the film to be shown only in limited art venues, and actors were paid $75 a day. If or when the film was sold for broader distribution, it was stipulated that the actors would receive an increased payment. On set operations, including catering, different location expenses, and the grip department, Aronofsky stated that "Every member of the crew was on deferment for $200 a day. This deferred personnel also split 45 profit points. But we couldn't find a grip or gaffer to do it for free, so we paid those guys $50 a day."

Most of the costumes used in the film were the actors' clothes, except for Sean Gullette's which came from thrift stores. There was a standard kit fee for make-up and hairstyling that amounted to about $25 per day.

The producers managed to get a free lighting package, and all of the money within the electric department was then shifted toward the gaffer and expendables. The Bolex H16 camera was borrowed, but the crew broke it, and money had to be budgeted to fix it; a Canon 16mm camera package was also used.

Vehicles used in the film included a cab and a station wagon. To obtain the cab, Aronofsky stated that they hailed a cab and paid the driver $100 to keep his car there. The station wagon belonged to the film's consulting producer, who rented it to them.

The film was sent to be developed in Bono Labs in Arlington, Virginia, which, according to Aronofsky, was the only one to develop black and white reversal stock. Consequently, the crew only received dailies after a week of sending the footage in. Raw stock cost $5,414 and developing it cost $18,000. While the crew was able to shoot in the warehouse for free, they did have to pay the electricity bill, which increased dramatically during filming.

During post-production, most of the budget went toward the negative cut, which was a match back from an AVID cut list. Clint Mansell created the score on his equipment, for which he was paid a deferred fee. The rest of the money for music went toward rights for festival entries. There was a separate budget for film and lab for post-production for the blow-up release print, which cost roughly $25,571. Another $3,000 went to the 35mm optical soundtrack.

The production cost was $60,927, and post-production costs amounted to $68,183. Along with other expenses, including insurance, the film cost $134,815.

Themes

Mathematics
Pi features multiple references to mathematics and mathematical theories. For instance, Max finds the golden spiral occurring everywhere, including the stock market. Max's belief that diverse systems embodying highly nonlinear dynamics share a unifying pattern bears much similarity to results in chaos theory, which provides machinery for describing certain phenomena of nonlinear systems, which might be thought of as patterns. During the climactic drill scene, a pattern resembling a bifurcation diagram is apparent on Max's shattered mirror.

The game of Go
In the film, Max periodically plays Go with his mentor, Sol. This game has historically stimulated the study of mathematics and features a simple set of rules that results in a complex game strategy. Each character uses the game as a model for their view of the universe; Sol says that the game is a microcosm of an extremely complex and chaotic world, while Max asserts its complexity gradually converges toward patterns that can be found.

Both Gullette and Margolis spent many hours learning the game at the Brooklyn Go Club, and had the help of a Go consultant, Dan Weiner, for the film. The film credits list Barbara Calhoun, Michael Solomon, and Dan Wiener as Go consultants.

Kabbalah
Early in the film, when Lenny begins talking with Max about his work, he asks if Max is familiar with kabbalah. The numerological interpretation of the Torah and the 216-letter name of God, known as the Shem HaMeforash, are important concepts in traditional Jewish mysticism.

Quran
Another religious reference comes when Max is in the market looking for that day's newspaper, when a recitation from the Quran can be heard in the background, which cites Quran 2:140: "Or do you say that Abraham and Ishmael and Isaac and Jacob and the Descendants were Jews or Christians? Say, 'Are you more knowing or is Allah?' And who is more unjust than one who conceals a testimony he has from Allah? And Allah is not unaware of what you do."

Soundtrack

Pi launched the film scoring career of Clint Mansell. The soundtrack was released on July 21, 1998, via Thrive Records. AllMusic rated it 4.5 stars out of five. A music video for "πr²", using an alternative mix of the title track, is available as a special feature on the π DVD, consisting of footage from the film intercut with stock color reels of ants, harking back to one of the film's visual motifs.

Credits
Design – Jeremy Dawson, Sneak Attack
Executive-Producer – Eric Watson, Ricardo Vinas, Sioux Zimmerman
Mastered By – Mark Fellows
Written-By [Voiceover] – Darren Aronofsky, Sean Gullette

Release
Produced on a budget of $134,815 (including $60,927 for production and $68,183 for post-production), the film was financially successful at the box office, grossing $3,221,152 in the United States despite only a limited theatrical release. It has sold steadily on DVD. Pi was the first ever film to be sold as a download or pay-per-view on the Internet. On the website Sightsound.com, the film was available for purchase as a download, as well as streaming in a pay-per-view window.

More than a decade after its theatrical release, rights to the film reverted from Lionsgate (owner of the Artisan library) back to Aronofsky, who sold it to A24 in 2023. The 8K and Atmos restoration version was released on March 14 by A24 in the IMAX format, to commemorate its 25th anniversary.

Critical reception
Pi was received well by critics upon release. On Rotten Tomatoes, the film has an 88% approval rating based on 56 reviews with an average rating of 7.3/10. The website's critical consensus reads: "Dramatically gripping and frighteningly smart, this Lynchian thriller does wonders with its unlikely subject and shoestring budget." On Metacritic, the film has a rating of 72 out of 100 based on 23 reviews, indicating "generally favorable reviews". 

Roger Ebert gave the film three and a half out of four stars, writing: "Pi is a thriller. I am not very thrilled these days by whether the bad guys will get shot or the chase scene will end one way instead of another. You have to make a movie like that pretty skillfully before I care. But I am thrilled when a man risks his mind in the pursuit of a dangerous obsession."

James Berardinelli gave the film three out of four stars, writing: "Pi transports us to a world that is like yet unlike our own, and, in its mysterious familiarity, is eerie, intense, and compelling. Reality is a fragile commodity, but, because the script is well-written and the central character is strongly developed, it's not hard to suspend disbelief....It probably deserves 3.1416 stars, but since my scale doesn't support that, I'll round it off to three."

See also
 List of films about mathematicians
 List of films featuring surveillance

Notes

References

External links

1998 films
1998 directorial debut films
1998 independent films
1998 thriller films
1990s avant-garde and experimental films
1990s English-language films
1990s psychological thriller films
American avant-garde and experimental films
American black-and-white films
American independent films
American psychological thriller films
American neo-noir films
Artisan Entertainment films
Fiction with unreliable narrators
Films about Jews and Judaism
Films about mathematics
Films directed by Darren Aronofsky
Films scored by Clint Mansell
Films set in Manhattan
Films shot in New York City
Films with screenplays by Darren Aronofsky
Hebrew-language films
Names of God in literature and fiction
A24 (company) films
Protozoa Pictures films
Sundance Film Festival award winners
Films shot in 16 mm film
Pi
1990s American films